Eteobalea iridella is a moth in the  family Cosmopterigidae. It is found in North America, where it has been recorded from Texas, Washington and California.

The wingspan is 11 mm. Adults have been recorded on wing from February to October.

References

Natural History Museum Lepidoptera generic names catalog

Eteobalea
Moths described in 1907